The Hungaroring is a  motorsport racetrack in Mogyoród, Pest County, Hungary where the Formula One Hungarian Grand Prix is held. In 1986, it became the location of the first Formula One Grand Prix behind the Iron Curtain. Bernie Ecclestone wanted a race in the USSR, but a Hungarian friend recommended Budapest. They wanted a street circuit similar to the Circuit de Monaco to be built in the Népliget – Budapest's largest park – but the government decided to build a new circuit just outside the city near a major highway. Construction works started on 1 October 1985. It was built in eight months, less time than any other Formula One circuit. The first race was held on 24 March 1986, in memory of János Drapál, the first Hungarian who won motorcycle Grand Prix races. According to a survey put together by the national tourism office of Hungary, Mogyoród ranks third among Hungarian destinations visited by tourists, behind the Danube Bend area and Lake Balaton, but ahead of Budapest. The circuit has FIA Grade 1 license.

Description

The Grand Prix is held in the middle of summer, which is usually extremely hot and dry in this region. Its first wet Grand Prix race was in 2006. The circuit is normally dusty due to underuse throughout the rest of the year and its sandy soil. As the circuit is in a valley about 80 percent of it can be seen from any point.

Normally, an underused circuit becomes faster over the weekend as the track surface gathers more rubber residue; however, with the Hungaroring this generally does not happen, because the track can get dusty so quickly. The track frequently becomes faster during a qualifying session, which leads competitors to try for their best lap as late as possible.

The twisty and bumpy nature of the circuit makes overtaking very difficult in dry conditions, the circuit is nicknamed "Monaco without the buildings" for this reason. Nonetheless, the Hungaroring has been the scene of several memorable races such as the duels of Nelson Piquet and Ayrton Senna, Nigel Mansell's win from 12th on the grid after a dramatic pass on Ayrton Senna in 1989, Damon Hill's almost victory with Arrows in 1997, and Michael Schumacher's change in strategy to beat the McLarens of Häkkinen and Coulthard in 1998. More recently, it has seen events such as Jenson Button triumphing over Fernando Alonso in the wet in 2006, Daniel Ricciardo scything through the field from sixth on the grid in 2014, Lewis Hamilton's late overtake on Max Verstappen to take the win in 2019, and Alonso producing a defensive masterclass to deny Hamilton a chance of victory in 2021. Maiden wins at the track include Hill in 1993, Alonso in 2003, Button in 2006, Heikki Kovalainen in 2008, and Esteban Ocon in 2021.

The first change in the track's layout was carried out in 1989, when the chicane after the actual turn three (a temporary measure put in during construction due to the discovery of a spring where the direct route was due to run) was removed by culverting the stream.

Drivers

Hungaroring has crowned two drivers in its 37-year history: both Nigel Mansell in 1992 and Michael Schumacher in 2001 were able to win the World Championship title. Moreover, the WilliamsF1 Team and Scuderia Ferrari also secured the Constructors' Championship at the Hungaroring, Williams in 1996 and Ferrari in 2001, 2002, and 2004.

Both Hungary's Zsolt Baumgartner and Poland's Robert Kubica made their debut on this track as the first F1 drivers of their countries.

The 2006 Hungarian Grand Prix was the first wet grand prix at the Hungaroring. This saw the retirement of many drivers including championship rivals Fernando Alonso and Michael Schumacher and gave Jenson Button and the reborn Honda F1 team their first win. Fernando Alonso also earned his first Grand Prix victory at this in 2003, declaring it his favourite track as a result.

According to statements and interviews, drivers have different opinions on the track. While many, like Ayrton Senna, Nigel Mansell, Michael Schumacher, Lewis Hamilton, Max Verstappen and Fernando Alonso claimed to love it, many others consider the track too slow, hot and demanding.
The technical driving center of the Hungaroring held former racer Gerhard Berger's name from 1998 until 2005 but later it was changed to Allianz.

The track also has named curves: Turn 4 is named after Nigel Mansell, due to him losing a wheel there during the 1987 Hungarian Grand Prix. Turn 11 is named after Jean Alesi following his massive crash there during qualifying for the 1995 Hungarian Grand Prix.

On Saturday, 25 July 2009, in the second round of qualifying for the Hungarian Grand Prix at Hungaroring, Ferrari driver Felipe Massa's head was injured, though protected by his driver's helmet, he was struck by a suspension spring that had fallen from Rubens Barrichello's Brawn GP car while driving at high speed. He was knocked unconscious, and subsequently crashed head-on into a tyre barrier. Massa was thereafter airlifted to the military hospital in Budapest, where he underwent surgery in the area surrounding his left eye. His condition was initially described as "life-threatening but stable", but improved rapidly. Massa was discharged from hospital the following week and returned to Brazil. After further tests it was decided that Massa needed a titanium plate inserted into his skull to strengthen it for racing in Formula One again.

Fans

While most of the foreign fans are from Germany and Austria, the Hungaroring has traditionally seen a large influx of Finnish fans as well. With the loss of the Austrian Grand Prix in 2003, this became the closest Formula One event for fans from other Central European countries. However, the Austrian Grand Prix returned again in 2014. The 2006–2010 races saw many spectators from Poland due to the participation of Robert Kubica. Michael Schumacher‘s success in the 1990s brought tens of thousands of German fans to Hungaroring each year. The trend began in 1992 and continued throughout the 2000s until his retirement in 2006. Schumacher won at Hungaroring in 1994, 1998, 2001 and 2004, finishing second in 2000 and 2002.

The contract is prolonged until 2027, although profits from tobacco advertising have been cut from the equation since such advertising was banned in 2007.

The Hungaroring is the home of Hungarian motorsport. Besides Formula One, it has also hosted the DTM and FIA GT Championship races. Since 2011, it also hosts the races of WTCC and WTCR as FIA WTCC Race of Hungary, a public drag race event takes place every month.

Events

 Current

 April: TCR Eastern Europe Trophy, ACCR Formula 4 Championship
 June: International GT Open, Formula Regional European Championship, Euroformula Open Championship, TCR World Tour, TCR Europe Touring Car Series, European Truck Racing Championship, Renault Clio Cup Europe
 July: Formula One Hungarian Grand Prix, FIA Formula 2 Championship Budapest Formula 2 round, FIA Formula 3 Championship, Porsche Supercup
 August: Porsche Sprint Challenge Central Europe

 Former

 24H Series 12 Hours of Hungary (2008–2011, 2013–2014, 2021)
 Auto GP (2006–2007, 2011–2015)
 Deutsche Tourenwagen Masters (2014, 2016–2018)
 Deutsche Tourenwagen Meisterschaft (1988)
 European Le Mans Series 4 Hours of Hungaroring (2010, 2013)
 European Super Touring Championship (2000–2001)
 European Touring Car Cup (2015, 2017)
 FIA ETCR – eTouring Car World Cup (2021–2022)
 FIA Formula 3 European Championship (2014, 2016–2018)
 FIA GT Championship (1998–2001, 2006, 2009)
 Formula BMW Talent Cup (2012–2013)
 Formula Renault Eurocup (2007–2015, 2017–2019)
 French F4 Championship (2019, 2021)
 GP2 Series Hungaroring GP2 round (2005–2016)
 GP3 Series (2010–2018)
 Grand Prix motorcycle racing Hungarian motorcycle Grand Prix (1990, 1992)
 GT World Challenge Europe (2016–2019)
 International Formula 3000 (1998–2004)
 Italian F4 Championship (2019)
 Sidecar World Championship (1990, 1997, 2005, 2012)
 Superbike World Championship (1988–1990)
 Superstars Series (2012)
 TCR International Series (2017)
 World Series Formula V8 3.5 (2007–2016)
 World Touring Car Championship FIA WTCC Race of Hungary (2011–2017)
 World Touring Car Cup FIA WTCR Race of Hungary (2018–2022)
 W Series (2021–2022)

Lap records

The official fastest race lap records at the Hungaroring are listed as:

Fatal accidents 

 9 August 2015:  Berto Camlek - Alpe Adria Road Racing Championship

See also
 List of Formula One circuits

References

External links

  
 Official Ticket Agency of the Hungarian F1 Grand Prix
 Hungaroring – the technical requirements
 A lap of the Hungaroring with Honda’s Alex Wurz
 Hungaroring Circuit History and Statistics
 Statistics from official F1 site
 BBC's circuit guide
 Ciro Pabón's Racetracks 3D views and virtual laps of all F1 circuits, including this one, via Google Earth
The Hungaroring on Google Maps (Current Formula 1 Tracks)

Formula One circuits
Grand Prix motorcycle circuits
Hungarian Grand Prix
Motorsport venues in Hungary
Superbike World Championship circuits
World Touring Car Championship circuits
Sports venues completed in 1986
1986 establishments in Hungary